Sanming University is a public university based in Sanming, Fujian province, China.

It was founded in October 2000.

References

External links
Sanming University Official Website (English edition)

Universities and colleges in Fujian
Educational institutions established in 2000
2000 establishments in China